Glen Clay Higgins (born August 24, 1961) is an American politician and reserve law enforcement officer from the state of Louisiana. A Republican, Higgins is the U.S. representative for Louisiana's 3rd congressional district. The district, which contains much of the territory once represented by former Governor Edwin Edwards and former Senator John Breaux, is in the southwestern corner of the state and includes Lafayette, Lake Charles, New Iberia and Opelousas. Higgins won the runoff election on December 10, 2016, defeating fellow Republican Scott Angelle.

As well as being an elected official, Higgins continues to hold a law enforcement commission in a reserve capacity with the Louisiana Attorney General's office.

Higgins has appeared and spoken at events organized by fringe, anti-government militia groups such as the Three Percenters and the Oath Keepers.

Early life and education
Clay Higgins is the seventh of eight children. He was born in New Orleans, and his family moved to Covington, Louisiana, when he was six years old. The family raised and trained horses. After graduation from Covington High School, Higgins attended Louisiana State University in Baton Rouge, Louisiana, but did not graduate.

Career
At age 18, Higgins enlisted in the Military Police Corps of the Louisiana National Guard, serving for six years (1979–85) and reaching the rank of staff sergeant.

He worked for several years as a manager of car dealerships.

Local law enforcement
In 2004, Higgins became a patrol officer for the Opelousas City Police Department. By 2007, Police Chief Perry Gallow was prepared to take major disciplinary action against Higgins. In a letter to the City Council, he wrote, "Clay Higgins used unnecessary force on a subject during the execution of a warrant and later gave false statements during an internal investigation...although he later recanted his story and admitted to striking a suspect in handcuffs and later releasing him". Higgins resigned before disciplinary action could be imposed. 

In September 2016, during his congressional campaign, Higgins claimed to have resigned from the police force for other reasons, calling Gallow "a peacock, a colorful, flightless bird". Gallow, by then retired as police chief, publicly disputed Higgins's version of events.

Higgins worked for the Port Barre Police Department through 2010. In 2011, he joined the St. Landry Parish Sheriff's Office. After the office's public information officer was reassigned in October 2014, Higgins was appointed to the position and promoted to captain. As public information officer, Higgins made videos for the parish Crime Stoppers program. He first used standard scripts, but began to improvise in his own style, appealing to suspects to surrender and sometimes threatening them by name. His videos went viral, and in 2015 he was described by national media as the "Cajun John Wayne" for his intimidating persona. Sheriff Bobby Guidroz urged restraint, advising Higgins to refrain from personal comments about suspects and to keep a professional tone in his videos.

Higgins also made a video for the state police, with a script that prompted protests from suspects' families and the ACLU. He resigned from the St. Landry Parish Sheriff's Office in February 2016. Guidroz had warned him against using disrespectful and demeaning language about suspects, ordering him to "Tone down his unprofessional comments on our weekly Crime Stoppers messages". He issued a statement saying that Higgins's comments underlined "a growing undertone of insubordination and lack of discipline on Higgins’ part". Guidroz said that Higgins had gone against department policy by misusing his badge and uniform for personal profit and gain, citing Higgins's wearing a uniform in an ad for a security firm. He also reprimanded Higgins for using his badge and uniform on his personal website to support sales of T-shirts and shot glasses for his Limited Liability Corporation (LLC). Higgins had also used the department's physical address in registering his corporation with the state. Both actions were against department policy.

Salon reported that during this period, Higgins "negotiated paid speaking appearances with other police departments. In one email, Higgins discussed his request for a speaker's fee that included shopping money for his wife and part of the fuel for a friend's private plane." He asked for cash payments. Higgins also conducted his private business via email on "his government email-account during work hours without the permission or knowledge of his supervisors. Higgins also appears to have attempted to conceal his earnings from the IRS in order to avoid wage garnishment for unpaid taxes. Whether those actions constitute tax fraud is unclear."

Shortly after resigning from St. Landry Parish, in March 2016, Higgins was accepted and sworn in as a Reserve Deputy Marshal in the city of Lafayette, Louisiana. Reserve forces in city and Parish Sheriff's offices in Louisiana receive regular training and are commissioned as law enforcement officers. They are part-time and made up of persons from many walks of life.

In 2019, Higgins retired his commission as a Reserve Deputy Marshal. He maintains an active law enforcement commission as a reserve officer with the Louisiana Attorney General's office.

Honors
Higgins was awarded the title of Kentucky Colonel in March 2016 by Kentucky Governor Matt Bevin.

U.S. House of Representatives

Elections

2016 
After Higgins's resignation from the St. Landry Sheriff's Office, Chris Comeaux, a Republican campaign staffer, recruited him to run for office. In May 2016, Higgins declared his candidacy in the 2016 election in the 3rd district. He crossed district lines to run for this seat, as his home in Port Barre is in the neighboring 5th district. Members of the House are not constitutionally required to live in the district they represent. A Super PAC headed by U.S. Senator David Vitter's former chief of staff supported Higgins's candidacy.

Higgins finished second in the nonpartisan blanket primary held on November 8, behind Republican Scott Angelle, in which nearly 68% of the parish voted. He faced Angelle in a runoff election on December 10 and won with 56.1% of the vote; turnout had declined to about 28% of voters.

2018 
Higgins was challenged by Democrats Rob Anderson, Mildred "Mimi" Methvin, Larry Rader, and Verone Thomas, Libertarian Aaron Andrus, and Republican Josh Guillory. President Trump endorsed Higgins. He defeated all six challengers in the jungle primary, winning reelection without a runoff.

In response to protests in response to the police shooting death of Trayford Pellerin, Higgins made a post on Facebook stating he would "drop 10 of you where you stand."

2020
Higgins was reelected with 67.76% of the vote to Democrat Braylon Harris's 17.89%, Democrat Rob Anderson's 11.59%, and Libertarian Brandon Leleux's 2.75%.

2022
Higgins was reelected with 64.3% of the vote to Republican Holden Hoggatt's 10.9%, Democrat Lessie Olivia Leblanc's 10.5%, Democrat Tia LeBrun's 9.4%, Republican Thomas "Lane" Payne, Jr.'s 1.8%, Independent Gloria R. Wiggins's 1.4%, Republican Jacob "Jake" Shaheen's 0.9%, and Libertarian Guy McLendon's 0.7%.

Tenure
Higgins was sworn into the House of Representatives on January 3, 2017.

He has said that he sleeps on an air mattress on the floor of his Capitol Hill office. He works out and showers in the House gymnasium in the early morning.

Higgins voted with other Republicans in favor of the American Health Care Act of 2017, which would have repealed and replaced major portions of the Patient Protection and Affordable Care Act.

In December 2017, Higgins voted with other Republicans in favor of the Tax Cuts and Jobs Act. He touted the Act's benefits, but the Congressional Budget Office projected that GDP growth would decline to 2.4% in 2019 as business investment and government purchases slowed.

Committee assignments 
Committee on Homeland Security
Subcommittee on Border Security, Facilitation and Operations (Ranking Member)
Subcommittee on Emergency Preparedness, Response and Recovery
Committee on Oversight and Reform
Subcommittee on National Security
Subcommittee on Civil Rights and Civil Liberties

Caucus memberships 

 Republican Study Committee
 Freedom Caucus

Political positions

Abortion 
Higgins is anti-abortion and has compared women choosing to terminate their pregnancy to the Holocaust.

Guns 
Higgins supports gun rights and opposes the regulation of firearms. In 2017, he said, "The modern hysteria over guns is another example of our weakened society. Guns weren't really regulated at all prior to the '60s in America. Throughout our history, prior to just 50 years ago, a child could purchase a gun from any seller, if Daddy sent him with the money."

In 2018, Higgins commented on his Facebook page about a New York Times op-ed by retired Supreme Court Justice John Paul Stevens that called for the repeal of the Second Amendment. Higgins said, "Judge John Paul Stevens, Your Honor, whatever... put together any badass socialists you can muster. As their attorney, make sure they have their affairs in order. Molon Labe."

Higgins opposes the carrying of weapons at demonstrations. In 2020 he posted on Facebook that he would "drop 10 of you where you stand", referring to potential armed demonstrators.

Immigration 
In July 2018, House Democrats called for a floor vote on abolishing U.S. Immigration and Customs Enforcement (ICE). House Republicans refused and called for the House to vote on a resolution by Higgins and Kevin McCarthy to support ICE.

LGBT rights 
Higgins opposes same-sex marriage. He says he believes that states should have the right to ban same-sex marriage, contrary to the Supreme Court's ruling in Obergefell v. Hodges.

National security 
Higgins supported Trump's 2017 executive order to temporarily curtail travel from certain countries, saying, "The president's executive order for a short-term restriction on visa entries from seven countries that are known to foster terrorists, combined with a systematic review of our immigration and vetting procedure, is reasonable."

Higgins has promoted himself and spoken at rallies by anti-government militia groups. When informed that a Black militia group protesting police brutality might show up at a protest, however, he suggested on Facebook in September 2020 that he would shoot them ("drop any 10 of you where you stand"). He included a picture of Black militia members at a protest. Facebook removed the post per its policy to remove content that "incites or facilitates serious violence".

On February 28, 2022, in response to the Russian invasion of Ukraine, Higgins tweeted, "You millennial leftists who never lived one day under nuclear threat can now reflect upon your woke sky. You made quite a non-binary fuss to save the world from intercontinental ballistic tweets", the meaning of which became a subject of minor debate.

Texas v. Pennsylvania
In December 2020, Higgins was one of 126 Republican members of the House of Representatives to sign an amicus brief in support of Texas v. Pennsylvania, a lawsuit filed at the United States Supreme Court contesting the results of the 2020 presidential election, in which Joe Biden defeated incumbent Donald Trump. The Supreme Court declined to hear the case on the basis that Texas lacked standing under Article III of the Constitution to challenge the results of an election held by another state.

COVID-19
During the COVID-19 pandemic, Higgins was an outspoken skeptic, and asserted that the Chinese Communist Party had created the disease as biological warfare.

In May 2020 CNN interview, Higgins described face masks as a "bacteria trap" and said they did not help to slow the spread of COVID-19, noting that he did not believe they were effective as smells are able to pass through them.

In May 2021, Higgins wrote on Facebook, "I do not support mandatory vaccines, mask mandates or any form of required vaccine passport." In July 2021, he introduced a bill that would make it illegal for employers to mandate vaccination for their employees. 

In the same month, Higgins confirmed that he and his wife had both contracted COVID-19 in January 2020, and that they had since contracted it a second time, along with their son. He has not publicly revealed his vaccination status.

Social media controversies

In early July 2017, Higgins posted a five-minute video on YouTube from Auschwitz concentration camp, including a section from within one of the gas chambers. He said, "This is why homeland security must be squared away, why our military must be invincible". This video was widely condemned as inappropriate, including by the Auschwitz-Birkenau Memorial and Museum, whose spokesman wrote in a Twitter post that "the building should not be used as a stage". Higgins later removed the video and issued an apology.

Several of Higgins's Facebook posts have been removed for contravening the company's policy against inciting violence. On September 1, 2020, Higgins posted a photograph of protesters at a Black Lives Matter protest in Louisiana, suggesting that armed demonstrators should be met with force to "eliminate the threat". After Facebook deleted the post, Higgins wrote: "America is being manipulated into a new era of government control. Your liberty is threatened from within. […] Welcome to the front lines, Ladies and Gentlemen. I suggest you get your mind right. I’ll advise when it’s time gear up, mount up, and roll out." This post was deleted for contravening the same policy.

Personal life
Higgins has been married four times. Higgins married Eloisa Rovati. They had a daughter together, who died a few months after she was born. Higgins and Rovati divorced. She later died in an automobile crash. Higgins then married Rosemary "Stormy" Rothkamm-Hambrice. He adopted her child from a previous marriage, and they had two more children together. They divorced in 1999. Higgins's third wife was Kara Seymour. They also divorced, and Higgins lives in Port Barre, Louisiana, with his fourth wife, Becca.

Rothkamm-Hambrice, then living in Mississippi, filed suit against him the day after the 2016 election for unpaid child support of more than $140,000, including interest on overdue payments. Higgins said that he sought reduced payments in 2005 after changing careers to law enforcement, but the issue was never settled. The Daily Advertiser reported: "Calls about the case made by this newspaper in September, first to the Texas Attorney General's Office, then to Louisiana courts, brought similar responses from both places: Clay Higgins was not in trouble with the courts in either state over the child support payments."

In August 2021, Higgins challenged a critic from Alaska who had called him a "traitor" for voting against certifying the 2020 election results to a physical fight in a ring, saying that he would be in Alaska in 2022; the challenge was accepted.

References

External links
Congressman Clay Higgins official U.S. House website
Campaign website

 

|-

1961 births
21st-century American politicians
American deputy sheriffs
American military police officers
Anti-crime activists
Far-right politicians in the United States
Living people
Louisiana State University alumni
Military personnel from Louisiana
People from Covington, Louisiana
People from New Orleans
People from St. Landry Parish, Louisiana
Republican Party members of the United States House of Representatives from Louisiana
Right-wing politics in the United States
Right-wing populism in the United States
American gun rights activists